Racin Gardner (born February 25, 1972 in Buellton, California), is a former professional racing driver who most notably raced in the 1996 Indianapolis 500 for Simon/Team Scandia. 

Previously, Gardner tested the Green Monster land speed car at Bonneville for four years, becoming the youngest driver ever to top 500 mph in 1988 at the age of 16. He drove off-road vehicles in the High Desert Racing Association from 1991-93, and was eighth in points and the rookie of the year in the American Indycar Series in 1993. After a second year in the series, he tested for the Project Indy team, which was competing in the IndyCar World Series.

Gardner intended to debut in the new Indy Racing League in 1996 at Phoenix. Despite failing to pass his rookie test in the "Test at the West" because of an engine failure, Gardner was entered at the last minute with Tempero/Giuffre Racing. However, further mechanical issues in practice left him unable to pass his test and compete. At the Indianapolis 500, he competed for Team Scandia, qualifying 25th on the second day of qualifiers. He retired after 76 laps with a suspension failure, being credited with a 25th place finish.

After Indy, Gardner would compete in one ARCA Racing Series race, at Charlotte Motor Speedway, finishing 18th. After retiring from racing, he became a stunt driver for television and motion pictures.

Racing record

Complete IndyCar Series results

Indy 500 results

References

External links

1972 births
American racing drivers
Living people
IndyCar Series drivers
Indianapolis 500 drivers
People from Santa Barbara County, California
Racing drivers from California